Terrell Evieoghene Oluwatoby Egbri (born 21 June 2001) is an English professional footballer who plays for Bishop's Stortford.

Career 
Born in Lambeth, Egbri joined the youth team of Southend United in 2015 from Carrib FC, before receiving a developmental contract with the club in the summer of 2019. 

He joined Harlow Town on loan in July 2019.

He made his debut for Southend on 1 October 2019, in a 2–0 defeat at home to Brighton & Hove Albion under-21s. He made his League One debut on 11 February 2020 in a 4–0 defeat away at Peterborough United, and scored the first goal of his senior career on 7 March 2020 in a 3–1 victory against Bristol Rovers.

On 22 January 2022, Egbri joined Southern League side, Farnborough on loan for the remainder of the 2021–22 campaign.

Egbri was released by Southend at the end of the 2021–22 season before joining Bishop's Stortford in July 2022.

Career statistics

References

2001 births
Living people
English footballers
Association football midfielders
Southend United F.C. players
Harlow Town F.C. players
Farnborough F.C. players
Bishop's Stortford F.C. players
English Football League players
Isthmian League players
Black British sportspeople